It Happened on 5th Avenue is a 1947 American comedy film directed by Roy Del Ruth and starring Victor Moore, Ann Harding, Don DeFore, Charles Ruggles and Gale Storm. Herbert Clyde Lewis and Frederick Stephani were nominated for the Academy Award for Best Story, losing to Valentine Davies for another Christmas-themed story, Miracle on 34th Street.

Plot
Aloysius T. McKeever (Victor Moore), a hobo, makes his home in a seasonally boarded-up Fifth Avenue mansion, each time its owner—Michael J. O'Connor (Charles Ruggles), the second richest man in the world—winters at his Virginia estate. McKeever winds up taking in ex-G.I. Jim Bullock (Don DeFore), who has been evicted from an apartment building O'Connor is tearing down for a new skyscraper, and later 18-year-old Trudy "Smith" (Gale Storm), who is actually O'Connor's runaway daughter. Jim soon invites war buddies Whitey (Alan Hale, Jr.), Hank (Edward Ryan) and their families to share the vast mansion when they are unable to find homes of their own.

When Trudy encounters her father, she tells him she is in love with Jim. She has not told Jim who she really is because she wants to win his love without her wealth. She persuades her father to pretend to be a homeless man named "Mike". McKeever reluctantly takes Mike in, but treats him like a servant. When Mike becomes fed up, he gives Trudy 24-hours to get the squatters out. Trudy calls Palm Beach to seek help from her mother Mary (Ann Harding), who is recently divorced from Michael. Mary comes to New York and pretends to be another homeless person to join the other squatters. McKeever, sensing Mary and Mike have feelings for each other, nudges them together. Eventually, Mike tells Mary he is a changed man and proposes. Mary accepts.

Earlier, McKeever had given Jim, Whitey, and Hank an idea to convert unused post-war Army barracks into much-needed housing, and persuaded Jim and the others to bid for an Army camp on the outskirts of New York City. Jim and his friends raise money from hundreds of other ex-G.I.'s in the same predicament. O'Connor also wants the property, and a bidding war ensues before O'Connor finds out who his competitor is. To try to get rid of Jim, his daughter's suitor, O'Connor sees to it that the construction company Jim approaches about his conversion plan rejects it and instead offers him a well-paying job in Bolivia, on the condition that he be single.

Celebrating Christmas Eve together, the residents are caught by two patrolmen, but McKeever convinces them to let the families stay until after the New Year. Jim then sadly reveals that the camp has been sold to O'Connor, and that he is considering the job offer in Bolivia, resulting in Trudy breaking up with him. When Mary and Trudy find out how Mike has manipulated the situation, Mary tells him that he has not changed after all, and that she and Trudy will leave for Florida. Ashamed, "Mike" arranges a meeting with O'Connor for Jim and his partners, who are dubious but accept. At the meeting, Mike reveals his true identity and transfers ownership of the camp to them, provided that they not reveal his identity to McKeever.

That night, everyone shares a New Year's dinner before restoring the house just as they found it. Mike, Mary, Trudy, and Jim bid farewell to McKeever as he heads off to do his annual squat at O'Connor's estate in Virginia, still unaware of the truth. Mike tells Mary to remind him to nail up the board in the back fence through which McKeever gets onto his property, intending to have McKeever come through the front door next winter.

Cast
 Don DeFore as Jim Bullock
 Gale Storm as Trudy O'Connor
 Victor Moore as Aloyisius T. McKeever
 Charles Ruggles as Michael J. "Mike" O'Connor
 Ann Harding as Mary O'Connor
 Grant Mitchell as Farrow
 Edward Brophy as Patrolman Cecil Felton
 Arthur Hohl as Patrolman Brady (uncredited)
 Alan Hale, Jr. as Whitey Temple
 Dorothea Kent as Margie Temple
 Edward Ryan as Hank
 Cathy Carter as Alice
 John Hamilton as Harper (uncredited)
 Charles Lane as Landlord (uncredited)
 Abe Reynolds as Finkelhoff the Tailor (uncredited)

Production
Monogram Pictures was trying to shed its reputation for low-budget films by setting up a new division, Allied Artists Productions (renamed Allied Artists Pictures Corporation in 1953, replacing Monogram entirely). It Happened on 5th Avenue was Allied Artists' first production.  At a time when the average Hollywood picture cost about $800,000 (and the average Monogram picture cost about $90,000), the Christmas-themed comedy cost more than $1,200,000.  It was rewarded with an estimated $1.8 million box office return.

The story was originally optioned by Liberty Films in 1945 for director Frank Capra (who decided to direct It's a Wonderful Life instead); later that year, producer-director Roy Del Ruth acquired the story.

The casting of Ann Harding and Victor Moore was announced in June 1946, Don DeFore and Gale Storm in July, and filming proceeded from August 5 to mid-October 1946. The production schedule and Christmastime climax of the story suggest the studio planned a Christmas release, but for an unknown reason, the movie's release was delayed until Easter 1947.

Songs
Four songs were featured in the movie, but Gale Storm was not allowed to sing them. She rehearsed them before filming started, but was told by director Roy Del Ruth that she would be mouthing to someone else's vocals. Storm, who had been the studio's musical star for years, recalled in her 1981 memoir: "I couldn't believe it. I thought that maybe the director didn't know I'd been singing and dancing in films, and that if I spoke to him he'd let me do my own numbers. Well, I asked him, and he said no. I asked him to look at some of my musicals, and he said no. I asked him if I could sing for him, and he said no. His theory was that if you were a dancer, you didn't sing; if you were a singer, you didn't dance; and if you were an actor, you didn't sing or dance. It was humiliating."

"That's What Christmas Means to Me" was not the Varnick-Acquaviva minor hit for Eddie Fisher but another song written by Harry Revel. Also, Betty Jane Rhodes recorded "You're Everywhere" in 1947.

Critical reception
The Washington Post thought the celebrity endorsements (by Frank Capra, Orson Welles, Al Jolson, Constance Bennett and others) used in the movie's advertising to be "high-flown" and "Hollywoodesque"; instead, the movie was a "mild, pleasant little film which probably will find many admirers."

Time wrote: "Most plausible explanations for the picture's success are: 1) the presence of Victor Moore, past master of creaky charm and pathos; 2) a show as generally old-fashioned, in a harmless way, as a 1910 mail-order play for amateurs; 3) the fact that now, as in 1910, a producer cannot go wrong with a mass audience if he serves up a whiff of comedy and a whirlwind of hokum."

Bosley Crowther in The New York Times praised its "geniality and humor" and the "charming performance" by Moore. The New Republic disagreed, calling it "childish stuff" and Moore "too cute for words".

Adaptations
The screenplay was adapted for a radio version on Lux Radio Theater in May 1947, with DeFore, Ruggles, Moore, and Storm reprising their roles; and a live television production for Lux Video Theatre in 1957, with Ernest Truex, Leon Ames, Diane Jergens, and William Campbell.

It was remade in Hindi twice in India: Pugree (1948) and Dil Daulat Duniya (1972).

TV broadcast
It Happened on 5th Avenue was part of a package of 49 Monogram and Allied Artists features from the late 1940s and early 1950s that were licensed for television broadcast in 1954.

Around 1990, the film essentially disappeared from broadcast and retail availability. Despite an Academy Award nomination, a cult following through a dedicated fan website, and many requests to Turner Classic Movies and American Movie Classics to show the movie, it was not broadcast on American television for nearly 20 years. It aired on Turner Classic Movies in 2009 and beginning in 2014, it is broadcast frequently during the holiday season. Hallmark Movie Channel also broadcast the movie in 2014.

Home media
On November 11, 2008, Warner Home Video released the film on DVD. In 2014, the film was made available for streaming and download in the digital format. On December 22, 2020, it was released on Blu-Ray by Warner Archive Collection. It is also available to be streamed on HBO Max.

See also
 List of Christmas films

References

External links
 
 
 
 

1947 films
1947 romantic comedy films
Allied Artists films
American Christmas comedy films
American romantic comedy films
American black-and-white films
1940s English-language films
Fictional hoboes
Films directed by Roy Del Ruth
Films set in New York City
1940s Christmas comedy films
Films scored by Edward Ward (composer)
1940s American films
Films about veterans
Films about marriage